The Kursenieki (– 'Curonians'; ;  – 'Prussian Curonians') are a nearly extinct Baltic ethnic group living along the Curonian Spit. "Kuršiai" refers only to inhabitants of Lithuania and former East Prussia that speak a southwestern dialect of Latvian. Some autochthonous inhabitants of Šventoji in Lithuania call themselves "kuršiai" as well.

Confusion

Kursenieki are often confused with the extinct Curonian Baltic tribe, as neighbouring ethnic groups called Kuršininkai/Kursenieki as Curonians: in German, Latvian and Lithuanian, Kursenieki and the Curonian tribes are known by the same terms (Kuren, kurši and kuršiai respectively). In Lithuanian scholarly literature, the name kuršininkai is used to distinguish them from the Curonian tribe. Similarly in Latvian kursenieki is used mostly exclusively by scientists to distinguish them from the Curonian tribe. On the other hand, Kursenieki should not be confused with Kurzemnieki, which are the geographical group of Latvians from Courland. 

The Kursenieki have never designated themselves as Latvians and called their own language "Curonian language" (kursisk valoud). From a linguistic point of view, it is a southwestern dialect of Latvian, while some linguists also consider it a sociolect as Kursenieki were predominantly fishermen. In German and Latvian writings of the 19th century, Kursenieki sometimes are called "Prussian Latvians". Kursenieki were loyal to Germany and identified themselves as German citizens and ethnic Kursenieki.

Language

The language spoken by the Kursenieki is called Kursenieki language. It is distinct from Curonian language (or Old Curonian) spoken by the Curonian people.

History

Origins
The exact origin of the Kursenieki is unclear. One version says that they are indigenous descendants of the Curonian tribe that lived there since antiquity, at least along the Curonian Spit. During the conquest of the Old Prussians and Curonians by the Teutonic Knights, the area became nearly uninhabited. In the process of various migrations of the 14th–17th centuries, Curonians from Courland settled near Memel, along the Curonian Spit, and in Sambia (all regions in East Prussia). They preserved the old self-designation of Curonians (kurši), while Curonians who stayed in Courland fused into Latvians. Over time the Kursenieki were assimilated by Germans, except along the Curonian Spit where some still live. Until the Soviet Army's takeover in 1945, several places in Sambia were named after Kursenieki, including Cranzkuhren, Neukuhren, Gross Kuhren, and Klein Kuhren. In 1649, Kursenieki lived from Memel to Danzig. At the end of the 19th century the total number of Kursenieki was around 4,000 persons.

Interbellum

Kursenieki were considered Latvians after World War I when Latvia gained independence from the Russian Empire. This consideration was based on linguistic arguments and was the rationale for Latvian claims over the Curonian Spit, Memel, and some other territories of East Prussia. Later these claims were removed. In 1923, the newly created Memel Territory separated the Curonian Spit in two parts. This separation interrupted contacts between Kursenieki. In 1933, Latvia tried to establish a cultural center for Kursenieki of the Curonian Spit where the majority of them lived, but that was opposed by Lithuania, of which Memel Territory was a part of.

After World War II

Near the end of World War II, the majority of Kursenieki fled from the Red Army during the evacuation of East Prussia. Kursenieki that remained behind were subsequently expelled by the Soviet Union after the war and replaced with Russians and Lithuanians.

Some Kursenieki managed to return to their homes after the war, but only 219 lived along the Curonian Spit in 1955. Many had German names such as Fritz or Hans, a cause for anti-German discrimination. Russian residents called the Kursenieki "fascists", while Lithuanians called them kuršiai. Neither Lithuania nor Russia have allowed the return to Kursenieki of property confiscated after World War II.

Culture

Curonians are one of the Baltic tribes. Their culture, religion and architecture are similar to those found in Germany and Sweden. Curonians are related with Lithuanians and Latvians. The Kursenieki were predominantly Lutheran, like most former inhabitants of East Prussia, although some ancient pagan customs were preserved. Most Kursenieki were bilingual or even trilingual: the Curonian language was used within the family and while fishing, German was used in everyday communication, and the language of church services was German and Lithuanian. The Kursenieki were primarily fishermen. Some elements of cuisine are named after Kursenieki, for example, Curonian coffee (Kurenkaffee); a drink made of vodka flavoured with coffee, honey and other ingredients was popular throughout East Prussia.

The first scholar who took an interest in Kursenieki culture and language was Paul Kwauka, a member of the separatist movement of Memel Territory. His book "Kurisches Wörterbuch" is a highly valuable source of information. The work of describing their heritage is continued by one of the last remaining Kursenieki, Richard Pietsch.

Surnames

The surnames of Kursenieki have various origins, including:
 Latvian, some with elements of Old Curonian: Gulbis, Kakies, Kuite, Kukulitis, Pinkis, Strangulis
 Lithuanian: Kalwis, Lauzeningks, Detzkeit, Jakeit
 Lithuanian or Latvian or Old Prussian: Dullis, Purwins
 German: Kiehr, Schmidt
 German with Baltic elements: Engelins
 Slavic: Pietsch
 Polish: Schadowski
 Old Prussian: Schekahn

Notable people

 Immanuel Kant (1724–1804) had Kursenieki roots on his paternal side.
 Ludwig Rhesa (1776–1840), translator, member of Lietuvininkai movement.

See also
 Curonians
 Curonian language
 East Prussia

Notes

External links

 Eva Pluhařova-Grigienė. The Curonian Spit: Identity and Cultural Heritage
 Historical features of the northern part of the curonian spit
 Map of languages in Prussia and Memelland in 1900  large
 Die Kuren 
 Rietumbalti un viņu kaimiņi kultūru krustcelēs 
 Kursenieki un to valoda Latvijas un latviešu pētījumos un publikācijās 
 Paskutinioji kuršininkų karta 
 Dalia Kiseliūnaitė. Kuršių Nerijos asmenvardžiai kaip gyventojų etninės sudėties liudininkai. Personennamen der Kurischen Nehrung als Zeugen der ethnischen Zusammensetzung der Bevölkerung 
 Baltu identitātes un etnosa saglabāšanās ilgtermiņa perspektīva. Baltų identiteto ir etnoso išlikimo ilgalaikė perspektyva. 
 Dalia Kiseliūnaitė Paskutinioji kuršininkų karta 

Ethnic groups in Lithuania
Baltic peoples
Endangered languages of Europe

de:Kuren